In physics, in the area of quantum information theory, a Greenberger–Horne–Zeilinger state (GHZ state) is a certain type of entangled quantum state that involves at least three subsystems (particle states, qubits, or qudits). It was first studied by Daniel Greenberger, Michael Horne and Anton Zeilinger in 1989. Extremely non-classical properties of the state have been observed.

Definition
The GHZ state is an entangled quantum state for 3 qubits and its state is

Generalization 
The generalized GHZ state is an entangled quantum state of  subsystems. This GHZ state is also named as -partite qudit GHZ state, it reads

.

In the case of each of the subsystems being two-dimensional, that is for M-qubits, it reads

In simple words, it is a quantum superposition of all subsystems being in state 0 with all of them being in state 1 (states 0 and 1 of a single subsystem are fully distinguishable).

Properties

There is no standard measure of multi-partite entanglement because different, not mutually convertible, types of multi-partite entanglement exist. Nonetheless, many measures define the GHZ state to be maximally entangled state.

Another important property of the GHZ state is that when we trace over one of the three systems, we get

which is an unentangled mixed state. It has certain two-particle (qubit) correlations, but these are of a classical nature.

This is unlike the W state, which leaves bipartite entanglements even when we measure one of its subsystems.

The GHZ state is non-biseparable and is the representative of one of the two non-biseparable classes of 3-qubit states which cannot be transformed (not even probabilistically) into each other by local quantum operations, the other being the W state, .
Thus  and  represent two very different kinds of entanglement for three or more particles.
The W state is, in a certain sense "less entangled" than the GHZ state; however, that entanglement is, in a sense, more robust against single-particle measurements, in that, for an N-qubit W state, an entangled (N − 1)-qubit state remains after a single-particle measurement.
By contrast, certain measurements on the GHZ state collapse it into a mixture or a pure state.

The GHZ state leads to striking non-classical correlations (1989). Particles prepared in this state lead to a version of Bell's theorem, which shows the internal inconsistency of the notion of elements-of-reality introduced in the famous Einstein–Podolsky–Rosen article. The first laboratory observation of GHZ correlations was by the group of Anton Zeilinger (1998), who was awarded the (shared) 2022 Nobel Prize in physics for this work. Many more accurate observations followed.  The correlations can be utilized in some quantum information tasks. These include multipartner quantum cryptography (1998) and communication complexity tasks (1997, 2004).

Pairwise entanglement

Although a measurement of the third particle of the GHZ state that distinguishes the two states results in an unentangled pair, a measurement along an orthogonal direction can leave behind a maximally entangled Bell state. This is illustrated below.

The 3-qubit GHZ state can be written as 

In the later case, the phase can be rotated by applying a Z quantum gate to give , while in the former case, no additional transformations are applied. In either case, the result of the operations is a maximally entangled Bell state.

This example illustrates that, depending on which measurement is made of the GHZ state is more subtle than it first appears: a measurement along an orthogonal direction, followed by a quantum transform that depends on the measurement outcome, can leave behind a maximally entangled state.

Applications
GHZ states are used in several protocols in quantum communication and cryptography, for example, in secret sharing or in the quantum Byzantine agreement.

See also
 Bell's theorem
 Local hidden-variable theory
 NOON state
 Quantum pseudo-telepathy uses a four-particle entangled state.

References

Quantum information theory